My Side of Town is the debut album by Lutricia McNeal, originally released in 1997 by CNR Music Sweden. The album was released with the title Lutricia McNeal in the UK by Wildstar Records. It includes the singles "Ain't That Just the Way" and "Stranded", which were big hits mainly in Europe, and "My Side of Town", which reached number one in New Zealand.

Critical reception

AllMusic editor Jaime Sunao Ikeda rated the US edition of album four and a half stars out of five. He found that the singles on the album indictaed "why she has been so successful so far: because of the talent she possesses and the ace production of her support."

Track listing

Original release

UK release

UK re-release

US release

Notes
 denotes co-producer(s)
 denotes additional producer(s)

Charts

References 

1997 debut albums
Lutricia McNeal albums